The 2012 SUGO GT 300km was the fourth round of the 2012 Super GT season. It took place on July 29, 2012.

Race results

References

 Race results 

SUGO GT 300km